The 19319 / 19320 Veraval - Indore Mahamana Express is an Indian express train belonging to Western Railway zone that runs between Veraval Junction and Indore Junction in India. It is currently operated once a week with 19319/19320 train numbers.

Coach composition
The train consists of 16 coaches :
 1 AC II Tier
 2 AC III Tier
 7 Sleeper Coaches
 4 General Unreserved
 2 Seating cum Luggage Rake

Service 

Route & Halts 
The important stops of the train are:

Schedule

Rake sharing
The train shares its rake with 19333/19334 Indore - Bikaner Mahamana Express.

Traction
Both trains are hauled by a Vadodara Loco Shed based WAP 5 or WAP 4E electric locomotives from Indore to Ahmedabad. From Ahmedabad, the trains are hauled by a Vatva Loco Shed based WDM 3A diesel locomotives to Veraval and vice versa.

References

Notes

External links 
19319/Veraval - Indore Mahamana Express
19320/Indore - Veraval Mahamana Express

Rail transport in Gujarat
Rail transport in Madhya Pradesh
Transport in Indore
Transport in Veraval
Mahamana Express trains
Memorials to Madan Mohan Malaviya
Railway services introduced in 2018